Below are the squads for the 1958 FIFA World Cup final tournament in Sweden.

France (1), Northern Ireland (19), Scotland (6), Sweden (5) and Wales (14) had players representing foreign clubs.

For the first time, seven players (one French, five Swedish and one Welsh) were selected from clubs from nations that did not qualify for the tournament (Italy and Spain).

Group 1

West Germany
Head coach: Sepp Herberger

 Players no. 18-21 did not travel to Sweden.

Northern Ireland
Head coach: Peter Doherty

 Players no. 18-22 did not travel to Sweden.

Czechoslovakia
Head coach: Karel Kolský

Argentina
Head coach: Guillermo Stábile

Group 2

France
Head coach: Albert Batteux

Yugoslavia
Head coach: Aleksandar Tirnanić

Players no. 20-22 did not travel to Sweden.

Paraguay
Head coach: Aurelio González

Scotland
Head coach: Dawson Walker (officially only acting manager in place of Matt Busby, who was seriously injured in the Munich air disaster and unable to resume his duties in time for the tournament)

Group 3

Sweden
Head coach:  George Raynor

Wales
Head coach: Jimmy Murphy

Note: Swansea Town (now Swansea City) and Cardiff City are Welsh clubs that play in the English football league system.

Hungary
Head coach: Lajos Baróti

Mexico
Head coach:  Antonio López Herranz

Group 4

Brazil
Head coach: Vicente Feola

Soviet Union
Head coach: Gavriil Kachalin

England
Head coach: Walter Winterbottom

Some sources state that England took only 20 squad members to the 1958 tournament in Sweden, and their squad lists do not include Alan Hodgkinson or Maurice Setters.  Other sources, including FIFA's official World Cup records, list 22 players on the squad and include both Hodgkinson and Setters.  The likelihood is that these two players were included on the squad list submitted to FIFA but did not travel to the tournament.

Austria
Head coach: Karl Argauer

Notes
Each national team had to submit a squad of 22 players. All the teams included 3 goalkeepers, except Argentina, Paraguay, Scotland, Hungary and Brazil who only called two.

References

 weltfussball.de 

Squads
FIFA World Cup squads